The NWFL Premiership (formerly Nigeria Women Premier League) is the top-level league for women's association football in Nigeria. It is the women's equivalent of the men's league, the Nigeria Professional Football League (NPFL). The Nigeria Women Football League (NWFL) organizes the Nigeria Women Premier League and the Nigeria Women Pro-league. In November 2017, Aisha Falode was elected chairperson of the league board, and was officially designated in January 2017.

History 
Women's football in Nigeria started in 1978 with the foundation of the NIFFOA (Nigeria Female Football Organising Association), renamed NIFFPA (Nigeria Female Football Proprietors Associations) in 1979, and joined by clubs like Jegede Babes, Ufuoma Babes, Larry Angels, Kakanfo Babes and others. The first championship was organised by the NFA in 1990. Ufuoma Babes were dominant in the 1990s, before succumbing to Pelican stars, who won the league between 1997 and 1902. By the 2010s, Rivers Angels became more frequent in the super tournaments, a mini tournament held annually among the top placed teams, to determine the overall winner for the league. Despite the high frequency of the abridged format over the years, the 2014 league season saw a straight round robin season in determining the league winners, however by 2015, there was a reintroduction of the group system.

Renaming
On 5 March 2020, the Nigeria Women Football League, the governing body of professional women's association football in Nigeria headed by Aisha Falode announced the re-branding of the women's league, by unveiling a new logo and renaming the three tiers of the league under the tutelage of the NWFL.

With the rebranding, the Nigeria Women Premier League is now known as the NWFL Premiership, the second-tier league known as NWFL Championship (formerly NWFL Pro-League) while the third tier division becomes the NWFL Nationwide (formerly NWFL Amateur League).

Format
The women's top division league in Nigeria usually follow an abridged format with a super tournament at the end of the season. The top teams in each group (sometimes 1, 2 or 3) will form the super tournament at the end of the regular season to determine the overall winner of league. The last placed teams are normally relegated to the second division, while promoted teams from the lower division are also admitted into the league. Despite the high frequency of the abridged format over the years, the 2014 league season saw a straight round robin season in determining the league winners, however by 2015, there was a reintroduction of the group system.

Champions 
The list of champions and runners-ups:

Most successful clubs

Individual honours

Top scorers

Player of the Season

Notes

See also 
 List of women's football clubs in Nigeria
 Nigerian Women's Cup
 Nigeria Women's Super Cup

References

External links 
 
 
 NWFL: Naija Ratels’ Bankole Olowookere bags December ‘Coach of the month award’ via The Informant247 Naija Sport

 
Women's association football leagues in Nigeria
Nigeria
Sports leagues established in 1990
1990 establishments in Nigeria
NWFL Premiership